Minuscule 50 (in the Gregory-Aland numbering), A232 (von Soden), is a Greek minuscule manuscript of the New Testament, on parchment leaves. Palaeographically it has been assigned to the 11th century. The manuscript has survived incomplete.

Description 

The codex contains the text of the four Gospels on 241 leaves (size ) with a commentary. The text is written in one column per page, 18-26 lines per page. It has considerable lacunae (Matthew 1:1-9.35; 12:3-23; 17:12-24; 25:20-32; John 5:18-21:25).

There is also a division according to the smaller Ammonian Sections, with references to the Eusebian Canons.

Text of Mark 14:40-16:20 was supplied by a later hand. The text is surrounded by a catena.

Text 

The Greek text of the codex is a representative of the Byzantine text-type. Hermann von Soden classified it to the textual family Family Kx. Aland placed it in Category V. 
It was not examined by the Claremont Profile Method.

It contains many unusual readings.

History 

The manuscript was dated by Gregory to the 11th or 12th century. Currently it has been assigned by the INTF to the 11th century.

In 1636 William Laud presented the manuscript to the Bodleian Library. It was examined by Mill (as Laud. 1) and Griesbach.

It was added to the list of the New Testament manuscripts by J. J. Wettstein. C. R. Gregory saw it in 1883.

It is currently housed in at the Bodleian Library (MS. Laud. Gr. 33), at Oxford.

See also 

 List of New Testament minuscules
 Biblical manuscript
 Textual criticism

References

Further reading 

 

Greek New Testament minuscules
11th-century biblical manuscripts
Bodleian Library collection